Arbanaško Hill is a hill in Serbia and is nearby to Pećanci, Staro Selo Dedinac and Petrovići. The hill is located near the village Arbanaška in the municipality of Prokuplje, Serbia.

See also 
 Arbanaška Mountain, a mountain in Serbia
 Arbanaška River, a river in Serbia

References

Hills of Serbia